Banzragchiin Oyuunsuren (born November 6, 1989) is a female wrestler from Mongolia.

References

External links
 bio on fila-wrestling.com

Living people
1989 births
Mongolian female sport wrestlers

World Wrestling Championships medalists
21st-century Mongolian women